Astrotischeria astericola is a moth of the family Tischeriidae. It was originally described by Annette Frances Braun as Tischeria astericola in 1972. It is found in eastern North American woodlands.

The larvae feed on woodland asters (Symphyotrichum), including Symphyotrichum cordifolium and Symphyotrichum lateriflorum. They mine the leaves of their host plant.

References

Tischeriidae
Moths described in 1972